Kurgunta is a census town in kalaburagi district in the Karnataka state of India.

Geography
It has an average elevation of 418 meters (1,371 feet).

Demographics
 India census, Kurgunta had a population of 8,584. Males constituted 51% of the population and females 49%. Kurgunta had an average literacy rate of 51%, lower than the national average of 59.5%: male literacy was 61%, and female literacy was 40%. 13% of the population were under 6 years of age.

References

Cities and towns in Kalaburagi district